{{Speciesbox 
| image = Lysiana murrayi flower.jpg
| image_caption = 
| image2 = Lysiana murrayi habit.jpg
| genus = Lysiana
| species = murrayi
| authority = (F.Muell. & Tate) Tiegh.
| synonyms = 
Loranthus murrayi F.Muell. & Tate
Elytranthe murrayi (F.Muell. & Tate) Engl. Loranthus murrayi F.Muell. & Tate var. murrayi Loranthus miniatus S.Moore Loranthus murrayi var. parviflorus S.Moore Lysiana miniata (S.Moore) Danser 
|synonyms_ref=
|range_map=LysianamurrayiDistMap6.png 
|range_map_caption=Occurrence data from AVH
}}Lysiana murrayi (or  Mulga mistletoe) is an erect or spreading hemi-parasitic shrub in the Loranthaceae (a mistletoe family) which occurs in all mainland states of Australia except Victoria. It has flat narrow leaves (which may sometimes be semi-terete with a channel on the upper surface).  The leaves are 2.5–6 cm long, 1–3.5 mm wide, do not have a distinct petiole, and the venation is not visible. The inflorescence is a solitary flower or pair of flowers without a common peduncle. The pedicels are 8–20 mm long,  and strongly winged towards the apex. The spreading, membranous bracts are  2–3 mm long, and rounded at the apex. The corolla of the mature bud is usually 18–28 mm long, and white, yellow or pink. The fruit is globose, 7–12 mm long, and pink or red.

It occurs from the Ashburton River in Western Australia, to the Western Plains of New South Wales and Queensland, growing in arid and semi-arid woodland and nearly always on Acacias''.

References

External links

Loranthaceae
murrayi
Flora of Australia
Parasitic plants
Plants described in 1894
Taxa named by Ferdinand von Mueller
Taxa named by Ralph Tate